Breyfogle is a surname. Notable people with the surname include:

Forrest W. Breyfogle III (born 1946), American author, lecturer, and management consultant
Norm Breyfogle (1960–2018), American comic book artist, fine artist, illustrator, and writer